= Harvey Wijngaarde =

Dutch footballer

Harvey Wijngaarde (born 23 January 1981) is a Dutch former professional footballer who made his Eredivisie league debut with club SC Heerenveen during the 2000–01 season. He also played for club MVV Maastricht during the 2001–03 seasons.
